The Tara Bai class of coastal patrol vessels is a series of six watercraft built by Singapore Slipway & Engineering and Garden Reach Shipbuilders & Engineers, Kolkata for Indian Coast Guard. They are intended for search and rescue, fisheries patrol and sovereignty patrol.

Design
The hull design of Tara Bai class is based on standard Lurssen 45-m hull steel construction. They are powered by two MTU 12V538 TB82 diesel engines and have two propellers with four blades. The vessels have various communication and navigation equipment including HF/DF and echo sounder and an autopilot.

Capacity
They carry ten tonnes of fresh water with a three ton/day distiller and have an endurance of 7 days. They have a five-ton bollard towing hook and a rigid inflatable boat. They have air-conditioned accommodation for a crew of 5 officers and 29 enlisted sailors.

Ships of the class

See also
 Rajshree class
 Rani Abbaka class
 Sarojini Naidu class
 Priyadarshini class
 Rajhans class
 Jija Bai class

References

External links
Garden Reach Shipbuilders & Engineers Ltd.

Fast attack craft of the Indian Coast Guard
Patrol boat classes
Ships of the Indian Coast Guard